Mrunmayee Deshpande (born 29 May 1988) is an Indian actress, who appears in Bollywood and Marathi movies. She has appeared in Hindi and Marathi films and TV serials and is a dancer And Anchor. Her first daily soap was aired on Star Pravah, named Agnihotra.

Early life 
Mrunmayee studied at Renuka Swaroop High school and Sir Parashurambhau College, 2007 both in Pune.

Career 
Mrunmayee had started her career with the Bollywood movie Humne Jeena Seekh Liya (2008), but she is well known for her role in the Zee Marathi Serial Kunku. She Worked in Comedychi Bullet Train as Anchor (Colors Marathi). Now she is working as an anchor on Zee Marathi's Sa Re Ga Ma Pa little champs 2021. She was a co-actor in Amazon Prime's Mumbai diaries.

Filmography

As actor

As director

Television

Stage

Web series

References

External links

 
 

1988 births
Living people
Indian film actresses
Actresses from Pune
21st-century Indian actresses
Indian television actresses
Marathi actors
Actresses in Marathi cinema
Actresses in Hindi cinema
Actresses in Marathi television